Tess Ledeux (born 23 November 2001) is a French freestyle skier who competes internationally.

She competed for France at the FIS Freestyle Ski and Snowboarding World Championships 2017 in Sierra Nevada, Spain, where she won a gold medal in slopestyle. She participated at the FIS Freestyle Ski and Snowboarding World Championships 2019, winning a medal.

She has earned four gold medals at the Winter X Games: three in big air and one in slopestyle. At the 2022 X Games, she won two gold medals, in slopestyle and big air, becoming the first woman to land a double cork 1620 in competition.

Ledeux represented France at the 2022 Winter Olympics in Beijing, China, winning a silver medal in the women's big air.

References

External links

2001 births
Living people
French female freestyle skiers
People from Bourg-Saint-Maurice
Sportspeople from Savoie
X Games athletes
Freestyle skiers at the 2018 Winter Olympics
Freestyle skiers at the 2022 Winter Olympics
Olympic freestyle skiers of France
Medalists at the 2022 Winter Olympics
Olympic silver medalists for France
Olympic medalists in freestyle skiing